

BWF events
Sudirman Cup (Details) (Glasgow, Scotland, June 10—June 17)
Final: China beat Indonesia, 3–0
Mixed doubles: Zheng Bo & Gao Ling beat Flandy Limpele & Vita Marissa, 19–21, 21–17, 21–19
Men's doubles: Fu Haifeng & Cai Yun beat Markis Kido & Candra Wijaya, 21–11, 21–13
Woman's singles: Zhang Ning beat Adriyanti Firdasari, 21–16, 21–9
Match cancelled after the tie winner already decided:
Women's doubles: Yang Wei & Zhao Tingting vs Greysia Polii & Vita Marissa
Men's singles: Lin Dan vs Taufik Hidayat
World Championships (Details) (Kuala Lumpur, Malaysia, August 7—August 19)
Men's singles: Lin Dan (CHN) beat Sony Dwi Kuncoro (INA) 21–11, 22–20
Men's doubles: Markis Kido & Hendra Setiawan (INA) beat Jung Jae-sung & Lee Yong-dae (KOR) 21–19, 21–19
Women's singles: Zhu Lin (CHN) beat Wang Chen (HKG) 21–8, 21–12
Women's doubles: Yang Wei & Zhang Jiewen (CHN) beat Gao Ling & Huang Sui (CHN) 21–16, 21–19
Mixed doubles: Nova Widianto & Lilyana Natsir (INA) beat Zheng Bo & Gao Ling (CHN) 21–16, 21–14
World Junior Championships (Details) (Auckland, New Zealand, October 25—November 4)
Team final: China beat South Korea, 3–1
Mixed doubles: Chai Biao & Li Xuerui lost to Shin Baek-cheol & Yoo Hyun-young, 18–21, 15–21
Men's singles: Chen Long beat Park Sung-min, 21–15, 21–14
Women's singles: Wang Lin beat Sung Ji-hyun, 21–12, 21–6
Men's doubles: Chai Biao & Li Tian beat Shin Baek-cheol & Chung Eui-seok, 18–21, 21–17, 21–13
Women's doubles: Wang Xiaoli & Li Xuerui vs Yoo Hyun-young & Jung Kyung-eun (canceled after tie decided)
Individual:
Men's singles: Chen Long (CHN) beat Kenichi Tago (JPN) 21–16, 21–14
Men's doubles: Chung Eui-seok & Shin Baek-cheol (KOR) beat Li Tian & Chai Biao (CHN) 24–26, 21–19, 21–15
Women's singles: Wang Lin (CHN) beat Bae Youn-joo (KOR) 21–16, 21–15
Women's doubles: Xie Jing & Zhong Qianxin (CHN) beat Yoo Hyun-young & Jung Kyung-eun (KOR) 21–18, 10–21, 21–15
Mixed doubles: Lim Khim Wah & Ng Hui Lin (MAS) beat Chris Adcock & Gabrielle White (ENG) 23–25, 22–20, 21–19

International events
European B Team Championships 2007 (Reykjavík, Iceland, January 17—January 21)
Final: Iceland beat Ireland 3–2
Mixed doubles: Tinna Helgadóttir & Helgi Jóhannesson lost to Karen Bing & Donal O'Halloran, 21–12, 13–21, 4–21
Women's singles: Ragna Ingólfsdóttir beat Chloe Magee, 21–18, 21–18
Men's singles: Njörður Ludvigsson lost to Scott Evans, 11–21, 15–21
Men's doubles: Helgi Jóhannesson & Magnús Ingi Helgason beat Donal O'Halloran & Mark Topping, 8–21, 23–21, 21–18
Women's doubles: Ragna Ingólfsdóttir & Tinna Helgadóttir beat Chloe Magee & Karen Bing, 21–16, 21–16
Europe Cup 2007 (Amersfoort, Netherlands, June 27—July 1)
Final: New League Primorye beat BC Amersfoort 4–2
Mixed doubles: Evgenij Dremin & Valeria Sorokina beat Eric Pang & Lotte Bruil-Jonathans, 21–12, 22–20
Women's singles (1): Evgenia Dimova lost to Yao Jie, 7–21, 11–21
Women's singles (2): Nina Vislova beat Larisa Griga (UKR), 21–17, 21–12
Men's singles (1): Stanislav Pukhov beat Dicky Palyama, 21–13, 21–18
Men's singles (2): Sergey Lunev lost to Eric Pang, 14–21, 14–21
Women's doubles: Nina Vislova & Valeria Sorokina beat Yao Jie & Lotte Bruil-Jonathans, 21–16, 21–10
Match cancelled after tie already decided:
Men's doubles: Alexey Vasiliev & Evgenij Dremin vs Dicky Palyama & Joéli Residay

New League Primorye: Representatives from Dutch players (unless notable)
BC Amersfoort: Representatives from Russian players

Pan American Games (Rio de Janeiro, Brazil, July 14—July 19)
Men's singles: Mike Beres (CAN) beat Kevin Cordón (GUA) 13–21, 21–11, 21–10
Men's doubles: William Milroy & Mike Beres (CAN) beat Bob Malaythong & Howard Bach (USA) 22–20, 21–13
Women's singles: Eva Lee (USA) beat Charmaine Reid (CAN) 21–14, 21–18
Women's doubles: Eva Lee & Mesinee Mangkalakiri (USA) beat Charmaine Reid & Fiona Mckee (CAN) 21–14, 21–15
Mixed doubles: Eva Lee & Howard Bach (USA) beat Val Loker & Mike Beres (CAN) 21–19, 21–16
Head Lausanne YI 2007 (Lausanne, September 28—September 30)
Under 17:
Men's singles: Rafael Galvez (ESP) beat Raphaël Van Wel (BEL) 21–16, 21–19
Women's singles: Sofie Descheemaecker (BEL) beat Carolina Marin (ESP) 21–12, 21–12
Men's doubles: Mattijs Dierickx & Freek Golinski (BEL) beat Anurag Barmecha & Kris Dendoncker (BEL) 21–14, 21–19
Women's doubles: Ewa Piotrowska & Edyta Tarasewicz (POL) beat Carolina Marin & Ana Maria Martin (ESP) walkover
Mixed doubles: Belinda Heber & Paul Demmelmayer (AUT) beat Leire Querejeta & Diego Errandonea (ESP) 21–19, 21–17
Under 19:
Men's singles: Luka Wraber (AUT) beat Petr Jelinek (CZE) 14–21, 21–17, 21–11
Women's singles: Lianne Tan (BEL) beat Adela Molnariova (CZE) 21–19, 19–21, 21–16
Men's doubles: Matez Bajuk & Aljosa Turk (SLO) beat David Obernosterer & Jan Sedimayr (AUT) 21–16, 21–16
Women's doubles: Steffi Daemen & Debbie Janssens (BEL) beat Janne Elst & Jelske Snoeck (BEL) 21–15, 21–17
Mixed doubles: Debbie Janssens & Damien Maquet (BEL) beat Cendrine Hantz & Livio Dorizzi (SUI) 21–17, 21–19
Copenhagen Masters 2007 (Falconer Centret, Copenhagen, December 27—December 29)
Men's singles: Peter Gade (DEN) beat Kenneth Jonassen (DEN) 21–18, 23–21
Women's singles: Xu Huaiwen (FRA) beat Zhou Mi (HKG) 21–11, 19–21, 15–9 (retirement)
Men's doubles: Jens Eriksen & Martin Lundgaard Hansen (DEN) beat Mohd Zakry Abdul Latif & Mohd Fairuzizuan Mohd Tazari (MAS) 21–11, 21–17

BWF Super Series

Malaysia Open (Kuala Lumpur, January 16—January 21)
Men's singles: Peter Gade (DEN) beat Bao Chunlai (CHN) 21–15, 17–21, 21–14
Men's doubles: Koo Kien Keat & Tan Boon Heong (MAS) beat Candra Wijaya (INA) & Tony Gunawan (USA) 21–15, 21–18
Women's singles: Zhu Lin (CHN) beat Wong Mew Choo (MAS) 21–15, 21–12
Women's doubles: Gao Ling & Huang Sui (CHN) beat Greysia Polii & Vita Marissa (INA) 19–21, 21–12, 21–11
Mixed doubles: Zheng Bo & Gao Ling    (CHN) beat Nathan Robertson & Gail Emms (ENG) 21–12, 14–21, 21–15
Korea Open (Seoul, January 23—January 28)
Men's singles: Lin Dan (CHN) beat Chen Jin (CHN) 21–14, 21–19
Men's doubles: Jung Jae-sung & Lee Yong-dae (KOR) beat Lee Jae-jin & Hwang Ji-man (KOR) 21–16, 21–15
Women's singles: Xie Xingfang (CHN) beat Zhu Lin (CHN) 21–14, 21–7
Women's doubles: Gao Ling & Huang Sui (CHN) beat Yang Wei & Zhang Jiewen (CHN) 12–21, 21–14, 21–16
Mixed doubles: Zheng Bo & Gao Ling (CHN) beat Thomas Laybourn & Kamilla Rytter Juhl (DEN) 22–20, 21–19
All England Open (Birmingham, March 6—March 11)
Men's singles: Lin Dan (CHN) beat Chen Yu (CHN) 21–13, 21–12
Men's doubles: Koo Kien Keat & Tan Boon Heong (MAS) beat Cai Yun & Fu Haifeng (CHN) 21–15, 21–18
Women's singles: Xie Xingfang (CHN) beat Pi Hongyan (FRA) 21–6, 21–13
Women's doubles: Wei Yili & Zhang Yawen (CHN) beat Yang Wei & Zhang Jiewen (CHN) 21–16, 8–21, 24–22
Mixed doubles: Zheng Bo & Gao Ling (CHN) beat Anthony Clark & Donna Kellogg (ENG) 16–21, 21–18, 21–14
Swiss Open (Basel, March 13—March 18)
Men's singles: Chen Jin (CHN) beat Simon Santoso (INA) 21–16, 21–10
Men's doubles: Koo Kien Keat & Tan Boon Heong (MAS) beat Jens Eriksen & Martin Lundgaard Hansen (DEN) 17–21, 21–16, 21–12
Women's singles: Zhang Ning (CHN) beat Lu Lan (CHN) 21–16, 21–18
Women's doubles: Yang Wei & Zhao Tingting (CHN) beat Lee Hyo-jung & Lee Kyung-won (KOR) 21–15, 21–10
Mixed doubles: Lee Yong-dae & Lee Hyo-jung (KOR) beat Muhammad Rijal & Greysia Polii (INA) 14–21, 21–16, 21–18
Singapore Open (Singapore, May 1—May 6)
Men's singles: Boonsak Ponsana (THA) beat Chen Yu (CHN) 21–17, 21–14
Men's doubles: Fu Haifeng & Cai Yun (CHN) beat Choong Tan Fook & Lee Wan Wah (MAS) 16–21, 24–22, 21–18
Women's singles: Zhang Ning (CHN) beat Xie Xingfang (CHN) 21–18, 19–21, 21–3
Women's doubles: Zhang Yawen & Wei Yili (CHN) beat Zhao Tingting & Yang Wei (CHN) 10–21, 21–19, 21–18
Mixed doubles: Flandy Limpele & Vita Marissa (INA) beat Sudket Prapakamol & Saralee Thungthongkam (THA) 21–14, 21–13
Indonesia Open (Jakarta, May 8—May 13)
Men's singles: Lee Chong Wei (MAS) beat Bao Chunlai (CHN) 21–15, 21–16
Men's doubles: Fu Haifeng & Cai Yun (CHN) beat Mohd Zakry Abdul Latif & Mohd Fairuzizuan Mohd Tazari (MAS) 21–17, 22–20
Women's singles: Wang Chen (HKG) beat Zhu Lin (CHN) 21–14, 21–13
Women's doubles: Du Jing & Yu Yang (CHN) beat Zhao Tingting & Yang Wei (CHN) 21–8, 16––21, 22–20
Mixed doubles: Zheng Bo & Gao Ling (CHN) beat Nova Widianto & Lilyana Natsir (INA) 21–16, 21–11
China Masters (Chengdu, July 10—July 15)
Men's singles: Lin Dan (CHN) beat Wong Choong Hann (MAS) 21–19, 21–9
Men's doubles: Fu Haifeng & Cai Yun (CHN) beat Markis Kido & Hendra Setiawan (INA) 21–15, 21–16
Women's singles: Xie Xingfang (CHN) beat Zhang Ning (CHN) 21–11, 8–21, 23–21
Women's doubles: Lilyana Natsir & Vita Marissa (INA) beat Zhao Tingting & Yang Wei (CHN) 12–21, 21–15, 21–16
Mixed doubles: Zheng Bo & Gao Ling (CHN) beat Donna Kellogg & Anthony Clark (ENG) 21–16, 21–17
Japan Open (Tokyo, September 11—September 16)
Men's singles: Lee Chong Wei (MAS) beat Taufik Hidayat (INA) 22–20, 19–21, 21–19
Men's doubles: Candra Wijaya (INA) & Tony Gunawan (USA) beat Luluk Hadiyanto & Alvent Yulianto (INA) 21–18, 21–17
Women's singles: Tine Rasmussen (DEN) beat Xie Xingfang (CHN) 21–15, 21–17
Women's doubles: Yang Wei & Zhang Jiewen (CHN) beat Zhao Tingting & Yu Yang (CHN) 21–17, 21–5
Mixed doubles: Zheng Bo & Gao Ling (CHN) beat Nova Widianto & Lilyana Natsir (INA) 21–19, 21–14
Denmark Open (Odense, October 23—October 28)
Men's singles: Lin Dan (CHN) beat Bao Chunlai (CHN) 21–15, 21–12
Men's doubles: Koo Kien Keat & Tan Boon Heong (MAS) beat Jens Eriksen & Martin Lundgaard Hansen (DEN) 14–21, 21–14, 21–12
Women's singles: Lu Lan (CHN) beat Zhang Ning (CHN) 21–17, 21–14
Women's doubles: Yang Wei & Zhang Jiewen (CHN) beat Lee Kyung-won & Lee Hyo-jung (KOR) 12–21, 21–19, 21–19
Mixed doubles: He Hanbin & Yu Yang (CHN) beat Nathan Robertson & Gail Emms (ENG) 21–17, 19–21, 21–17
French Open (Paris, October 30—November 4)
Men's singles: Lee Chong Wei (MAS) beat Bao Chunlai (CHN) 21–11, 21–14
Men's doubles: Fu Haifeng & Cai Yun (CHN) beat Choong Tan Fook & Lee Wan Wah (MAS) 21–14, 21–19
Women's singles: Xie Xingfang (CHN) beat Pi Hongyan (FRA) 21–13, 21–13
Women's doubles: Zhang Yawen & Wei Yili (CHN) beat Zhao Tingting & Yu Yang (CHN) 21–10, 21–15
Mixed doubles: Flandy Limpele & Vita Marissa (INA) beat Xie Zhongbo & Zhang Yawen (CHN) 21–11, 21–15
China Open (Beijing, November 20—November 25)
Men's singles: Bao Chunlai (CHN) beat Lee Chong Wei (MAS) 21–12, 21–13
Men's doubles: Markis Kido & Hendra Setiawan (INA) beat Guo Zhendong & Xie Zhongbo (CHN) 21–12, 21–19
Women's singles: Wong Mew Choo (MAS) beat Xie Xingfang (CHN) 21–16, 8–21, 21–17
Women's doubles: Gao Ling & Zhao Tingting (CHN) beat Du Jing & Yu Yang (CHN) 17–21, 21–15, 21–8
Mixed doubles: Nova Widianto & Lilyana Natsir (INA) beat Sudket Prapakamol & Saralee Thungthongkam (THA) 15–21, 21–18, 21–11
Hong Kong Open (Hong Kong, November 27—December 2)
Men's singles: Lin Dan (CHN) beat Lee Chong Wei (MAS) 9–21, 21–15, 21–15
Men's doubles: Markis Kido & Hendra Setiawan (INA) beat Candra Wijaya (INA) & Tony Gunawan (USA) 21–12, 18–21, 21–13
Women's singles: Xie Xingfang (CHN) beat Zhu Lin (CHN) 21–19, 21–14
Women's doubles: Du Jing & Yu Yang (CHN) beat Zhang Yawen & Wei Yili (CHN) 22–20, 13–21, 21–17
Mixed doubles: Nova Widianto & Lilyana Natsir (INA) beat Zheng Bo & Gao Ling (CHN) 21–23, 21–18, 21–19

BWF Grand Prix Gold and Grand Prix

Level 4

International Challenge
Internacional de España 2007 (Madrid, May 24—May 27)
White nights (Saint Petersburg, July 10—July 15)
Turkiye International 2007 (Istanbul, August 30—September 2)
Canadian Open 2007 (Saskatoon, Saskatchewan, September 4—September 8)
Belgian International 2007 (Mechelen, September 6—September 9)
Bulgarian International Championships'07 (Sofia, October 3—October 7)
Norwegian International Championship 2007 (Oslo, November 15—November 18)
Scottish International Championships 2007 (Glasgow, November 21—November 25)
2007 Irish International Championship (Lisburn, December 6—December 9)
VII Italian International 2007 (Rome, December 11—December 14)

International Series
Swedish International Stockholm 2007 (Täby, Stockholm, January 25—January 28)
Austrian International Championships 2007 (Vienna, February 22—February 25)
Croatian International 2007 (Zagreb, March 1—March 4)
Banuinvest International Championships 2007 (Timișoara, March 22—March 25)
Finnish International Championships 2007 (Helsinki, March 29—April 1)
Van Zundert Velo Holland Open 2007 (Wateringen, April 12—April 15)
42nd Portuguese International Championships 2007 (Caldas da Rainha, April 19—April 22)
31st Intermedica Polish Open Championships 2007 (Inowłódz, Spała, April 26—April 29)
2007 Australian International (Brisbane, May 25—May 27)
Asian Satellite 2007 (Singapore, May 30—June 2)
2007 Victorian International (Melbourne, July 12—July 15)
North Shore City International (Auckland, July 19—July 22)
2007 Ballarat International (Melbourne, September 6—September 9)
Waikato International 2007 (Hamilton, September 13—September 16)
Czech International 2007 (Brno, September 20—September 23)
Cyprus International 2007 (Nicosia, October 11—October 14)
32nd Hungarian International Champ 2007 (Budapest, November 1—November 4)
Iceland Express International 2007 (Reykjavík, November 8—November 11)
Welsh International 2007 (Cardiff, November 29—December 2)
Hellas Victor 2007 (Thessaloniki, December 18—December 22)

Future Series

XII Peru International (Lima, April 12—April 15)
IX Miami Pan Am (2007) (Miami Lakes, Florida, April 19—April 21)
Carebaco International Open 2007 (Suriname, June 7—June 10)
Slovak International 2007 (Prešov, September 27—September 30)

See also
2007 in sports

 
Badminton by year